Brad Binder (born 11 August 1995) is a South African Grand Prix motorcycle racer. He is most-known for winning the 2016 Moto3 World Championship. In November 2019 he was confirmed as Red Bull KTM Factory Racing rider in MotoGP class for the 2020 season, replacing Johann Zarco who had abandoned his factory ride earlier during that year.

Previously, he had competed in the Moto2 class during 2019, with the Ajo KTM team, finishing the championship in second place. Prior to moving up into Grand Prix level, Binder contested three seasons of the Red Bull MotoGP Rookies Cup, with a best finish of fifth overall in the championship standings.

At the 2016 Spanish motorcycle Grand Prix in Jerez, Binder became the first South African to win a motorcycle Grand Prix since Jon Ekerold won the 350 cc class at the 1981 Italian motorcycle Grand Prix. From 2017, Binder raced in the Moto2 class having agreed to a deal with Ajo Motorsport.

Binder's younger brother Darryn is also a motorcycle racer, and competed alongside Binder in Moto3 in both 2015 and 2016.

Binder became the first South African to win a MotoGP championship race at the 2020 Czech Republic motorcycle Grand Prix, also becoming the first rider to win with KTM in the premier class, as well as being the first rookie to win in MotoGP since Marc Márquez at the 2013 Motorcycle Grand Prix of the Americas.

Career

Early career
He began his motorsports career in go-karting  in 2003. In 2005 he switched to two wheels, immediately winning several titles in the 50cc, 125cc and 150cc categories. In 2008 he made his international debut, competing in the Aprilia Superteens Series, a British competition. In his first race he finished in second place, but in the second race he crashed. In 2009 he raced in the Red Bull MotoGP Rookies Cup finishing 14th, in 2010 he finished 5th, and in 2011 he finished 7th.

125cc/Moto3 World Championship

RW Racing GP (2011–2012)
Binder started his Grand Prix career in the 125cc class riding an Aprilia for RW Racing GP in the 2011 season with his bike number as 14. Binder finished the season pointless, with his best position being a 17th place in Indianapolis.

In 2012, he switched to the Kalex KTM with his bike number changed to 41. Binder's first Moto3 point came at the 2012 Portuguese motorcycle Grand Prix. 2012 was a crash-filled season for Binder, with seven crashes. Binder scored four times in the season, with his best result of fourth place coming in Valencia. He finished the season at 21st place with 24 points.

Abrogio Racing (2013–2014)
In 2013 Binder switched from Kalex KTM to Suter Honda and later to Mahindra with the team Ambrogio Racing. 2013 was a consistent year for Binder; he scored in 14 out of the 18 races, his best result being a fourth place at Spain; he finished the final standings at 13th place with 66 points. In 2014, he improved with 2 podiums to 11th place.

Red Bull KTM Ajo (2015–2016)
In 2015 Binder again switched teams to the KTM factory-supported Ajo Motorsport. His first season on the new machine was largely positive with regular points finishes and 4 podiums leading to an overall 6th place finish.

In the 2016 season, he built on this success with 7 wins and 14 podiums en route to his first world championship, with a 142 point margin over 2nd place.

Moto2 World Championship

Red Bull KTM Ajo (2017–2019)

2017
In 2017, Binder moved up to the Moto2 class, continuing with Red Bull KTM Ajo. In his first season he achieved 3 podiums on the way to 8th place in the riders' standings; despite having an injury and being forced to miss a few rounds.

2018
In 2018, Binder improved with 3 wins and consistent points finishes to achieve 3rd place in the championship.

2019
In 2019, after a difficult start to the season for KTM with the new Triumph engine, Binder took 5 wins and 9 podiums to finish in 2nd place as the best KTM rider, just 3 points off champion Álex Márquez.

MotoGP World Championship

Red Bull KTM Factory Racing (2020–present)

2020

Binder made his MotoGP debut with Red Bull KTM Factory Racing team in the 2020 season. Binder won his first MotoGP race at the third round of the season in Brno. This was also the first race win for the Red Bull KTM Factory Racing team in the premier class.

2021
Binder, along with KTM, had a rough start to the 2021 season. Despite this, he maintained top ten positions and got into the top 5 four times, with two 5th places at Portimao and Mugello and two 4th place finishes at Sachsenring and Assen.

Binder scored a surprise home track victory for KTM at the Austrian MotoGP Grand Prix when, with 5 laps remaining and rain beginning to fall, he decided to take the chance of finishing the race on slicks while most other leading riders chose to pit and swap to motorcycles fitted with wet tires. The gamble paid off and despite extremely slick conditions and mostly ineffective brakes due to the wet and cold track surface, he was able to withstand a late charge by Ducati rider Francesco Bagnaia and win the race.

2022
Binder stayed with Red Bull KTM Factory Racing team for a third consecutive season for the 2022 World Championship. He started off the year with an overachieving 2nd place finish at the Qatar Grand Prix. From then on, Brad has been a consistent top 10 finisher, with a tendency to perform better in race trim than in qualifying trim, as has been the case with his teammate Miguel Oliveira. He attained his first ever top 3 qualifying result in MotoGP at the 2022 Japanese Grand Prix, which he followed up with his second podium finish of the season, in 2nd position.

2023
Binder has a contract with Red Bull KTM Factory Racing for the 2023 World Championship and 2024.

Career statistics

Red Bull MotoGP Rookies Cup

Races by year
(key) (Races in bold indicate pole position, races in italics indicate fastest lap)

CEV Buckler Moto3 Championship

Races by year
(key) (Races in bold indicate pole position, races in italics indicate fastest lap)

Grand Prix motorcycle racing

By season

By class

Races by year
(key) (Races in bold indicate pole position; races in italics indicate fastest lap)

References

External links

 
  (Old website)
  (Current website)

1995 births
Living people
South African motorcycle racers
125cc World Championship riders
Moto3 World Championship riders
Moto2 World Championship riders
People from Potchefstroom
KTM Factory Racing MotoGP riders
MotoGP World Championship riders
White South African people
Moto3 World Riders' Champions